The English Baseball Association (EBA) was founded in 1892 and is the governing body of the traditional code of British baseball in England.

It is based in Liverpool and is a member of the International Baseball Board.

References

External links
English Baseball Association

British baseball in the United Kingdom
Base
Governing bodies of British baseball
Sports organizations established in 1892